Raver railway station serves Raver in Jalgaon district in the Indian state of Maharashtra. it is the Lifeline for the People who used to Updown From Raver to Jalgaon for their Job.

Electrification
Railways in the Raver area were electrified in 1988–89.

Amenities 

Amenities at Raver railway station include: computerized reservation office, waiting room, retiring room and book stall.

References

External links 
  Departures from Raver
 
 
Book Indian Railway Tickets
Train Running Status

See also

 High-speed rail in India
 Indian Railways
 List of railway stations in India

Railway stations in Jalgaon district
Bhusawal railway division
Railway stations opened in 1860